The 1951–52 Sussex County Football League season was the 27th in the history of the competition.

League table
The league featured 15 clubs, 13 which competed in the last season, along with two new clubs:
 Brighton Old Grammarians
Crawley

Eastbourne Comrades changed name to Eastbourne United.

League table

References

1951-52
9